UH Racing is a Formula Student team run by students attending the University of Hertfordshire, ranked 7th EV team in the UK and 95th EV team in the world as of the 11th December 2022. UH Racing's peak international ranking was 7th, achieved in 2010.

The team entered the inaugural Formula Student competition hosted in the United Kingdom in 1998, at the MIRA proving ground.

The team has entered at least one vehicle in every subsequent Formula Student UK competition, with the exception of 2021. Additionally, UH Racing has travelled abroad to enter other Formula Student events, such as Formula Student Germany, Formula Student Italy, and Formula Student Netherlands.

UH Racing has often been at the forefront of FS innovation, being the first UK team to compete with an electric vehicle with UH12A in 2009. In 2020, the decision to return to electric powertrain was made, and the team is now exclusively EV.

UH Racing at Formula Student UK 

Data has been filled in where available, but several values are still missing.

*the Lap Time Simulation (LTS) event was first included in the FSUK competition in 2022.

**in 2020, Formula Student UK's competition format was changed temporarily due to the COVID-19 pandemic. UH Racing chose to continue the development of their vehicle into 2021, intending to compete with UH23 at FSUK 2021. Unfortunately, further delays associated with the pandemic meant the car was not ready to enter, and further development continued into 2022.

UH Racing has finished in the top three at Formula Student UK a total of three times, according to the IMechE website.

UH Racing at international competitions

References 

Formula SAE
University of Hertfordshire